Jesús Gerardo Cortez Mendoza (born 28 January 1963) is a Mexican politician from the National Action Party. From 2009 to 2012 he served as Deputy of the LXI Legislature of the Mexican Congress representing Baja California.

References

1963 births
Living people
Politicians from Tijuana
National Action Party (Mexico) politicians
21st-century Mexican politicians
Members of the Congress of Baja California
Deputies of the LXI Legislature of Mexico
Members of the Chamber of Deputies (Mexico) for Baja California